Hope Boykin is an American dancer, choreographer, educator, director, writer, and speaker who is a former member of the Alvin Ailey American Dance Theater. Her mission is to create and share "within an environment of acceptance, brings new levels of awareness. Exploring, developing, and teaching a sound and healthy approach to movement and expression, promotes growth. Lifting and leading young and aspiring artists to a secure foundation and a concrete understanding evolves a confidence and an assurance which will be unmatched. There are no limits." She has inspired many with her journey to sharing her continued explorations with others on her path to search for hope. She continues to exhibit that her voice is indeed relevant and continues to remain significant within the dance community and world today.

Early life and education 
Boykin was born in Durham, North Carolina, where she started taking dance classes at the age of four. She went on to study with the American Dance Festival and, while a student at Howard University in Washington, D.C., performed with Lloyd Whitmore’s New World Dance Company. While in college, she felt a calling to move to New York City to study at The Ailey School.

Career 
After leaving Howard University, Boykin commenced study at The Ailey School in New York City; while still a student there, she was invited to be a founding member of Dwight Rhoden and Desmond Richardson's Complexions Contemporary Ballet.  From there, she went on to perform, work with, and choreograph for Philadanco, Philadanco under Joan Myers Brown for many years. During this early period of her career, she also worked as an assistant to choreographers, Milton Myers and the late Talley Beatty., an original member of Complexions Contemporary Ballet. She also went on to work with and choreograph for many other dance company’s – in addition to ones previously mentioned – including the University of The Arts, American Ballet Theatre Studio Company, BalletX, Dallas Black Dance Theatre, Minnesota Dance Theater, Ballet East, and the company in her name, HopeBoykinDance.

In 2000, Boykin was invited to join the Alvin Ailey American Dance Theater. Called "a small force of nature on the stage" by The New York Times, in her career with Ailey she has performed an extensive repertoire in 71 countries across six continents.  She has also taken part in offstage Ailey initiatives, including hosting their Ailey All Access video series. While there, she choreographed three works for the Company: Acceptance In Surrender (2005); Go in Grace (2008); and r-Evolution, Dream (2016).  In 2020, Hope completed her 20th and final year as a member of the company. Her final performance with the company was cancelled due to the coronavirus pandemic, coronavirus pandemic. but that didn’t stop her. She continued to pursue her mission as a dancer as well as her work as a mentor, speaker, choreographer, and “educator of world renown.” As Hope said during an interview, “during the world’s intermission, who knows what I’ll discover next?”.

Recently, she began working in theater where she choreographed for the Atlantic Theater’s Homecoming Queen, Public Theater’s Public Studio The Loophole and New York City Center’s Encores Off-Center Promenade.

In 2019, Boykin joined the faculty and worked as an educator for the University of Southern California (USC)'s Glorya Kaufman School of Dance as the Artist in Residence for the 2019-2020 academic year. In 2020, she began serving as the Artistic Advisor for Dance Education at the Kennedy Center and Artistic Lead for the Kennedy Center Kennedy Center Dance Lab (KCDL), a two-week dance and leadership program for high school students. Hope was also the Artistic Advisor for Howard University Dance Department’s 2021 Spring Semester and organized the Spring Concert. Recently, she and HopeBoykinDance received a grant from the Andrew W. Mellon Foundation for a Covid safe #BoykinBubble, which turned into a live-stream performance at the Annenberg Center in Philadelphia, PA.   
 
Boykin strives to lead young, aspiring artists to a concrete understanding and efficient methods for a secure foundation of technical and artistic movement. She shares her expertise of the Horton Technique, classical and other modern, jazz, and contemporary dance styles. As she shares her knowledge, she insists on having an honest and positively guided atmosphere, which allows her classes, coaching, and studio time to be effective, memorable, and exciting; therefore, developing a confidence within the students because THERE ARE NO LIMITS.

Boykin’s inspiration for choreographing is a combination of life’s best influences, as well as her own influences, and personal experiences to construct and design, inform, and display her ideas. These inspirations then allow her to continue to build her vocabulary of movement and further define her voice and style. The continual building of her vocabulary creates an outlet to help her create and share new works, collaborate with other dancers and composers, and fixate on her “Movement-Language” as a dancer and choreographer.

Selected choreography 
Boykin's work as a choreographer includes:
 Acceptance In Surrender (2005) - commissioned by the Alvin Ailey American Dancer Theater and created in collaboration with fellow Ailey Company members Abdur-Rahim Jackson and Matthew Rushing
 in.ter.pret (2006) - commissioned by the Dallas Black Dance Theatre
 Go in Grace (2008) - commissioned by the Alvin Ailey American Dancer Theater for the Company's 50th anniversary season, with music by the award-winning gospel choir and singing group Sweet Honey in the Rock
 r-Evolution Dream (2016) - commissioned by the Alvin Ailey American Dancer Theater and inspired by the sermons and speeches of Dr. Martin Luther King Jr., with original score by Ali Jackson and historic and original text narrated by Tony Award-winning actor Leslie Odom Jr.
 MomentsUponMoments (2018) - commissioned by Damian Woetzel for DEMO at the Kennedy Center and reinterpreted for the 2019 Vail Dance Festival
 Tribute to Joan Myers Brown (2019) - commissioned by the 2019 Bessie Awards as part of a tribute to Joan Myers Brown in recognition of her lifetime achievement award for work as a dance education pioneer
 On. Toward. Press. (2020) - commissioned by the Dallas Black Dance Theatre
 ReDefine US, From The Inside OUT (2021) – commissioned by HopeBoykinDance and created during her Andrew W Mellon Foundation funded Boykin Bubble residency

Honors 
 Bessie Award (1998) - Outstanding Performer (with Philadanco/Dance Women Living Legends) 
 Urban Bush Women Choreographic Center Fellow (2019–20)
 Bessie Award / New York Dance and Performance Award (2021) – Break Out Choreographer (for her many virtual works and presentations during the pandemic)

References 

Year of birth missing (living people)
Living people